Joseph Daning (born December 12, 1942) is an American politician. He is a member of the South Carolina House of Representatives from the 92nd District, serving since 2008. He is a member of the Republican party. He served in the United States Air Force from 1960 to 1964. He graduated from Southern Illinois University in 1995. He lives in Goose Creek.

References

Living people
1942 births
Republican Party members of the South Carolina House of Representatives
21st-century American politicians